The Open Fist Theatre is both a 501(c)(3) non-profit theatre company.  Originally operating a 99-seat theatre facility in Theatre Row Hollywood located at 6209 Santa Monica Blvd, it is now in residence at the Atwater Village Theatre. The name of the Open Fist Theatre Company comes from two principles: the notion of an open spirit and the fist - a sign of determination and force.

The OFTC was founded in 1990 by Ziad Hamzeh (Artistic Director), Michael Denney (Actor/Playwright/Teacher), Tim Pulice (Actor), Brian Muir (Actor) and Kathleen Dunn (Actor/Teacher), all of whom were graduates of the Theater Program of California State University, Fullerton. , Martha Demson has been the company's artistic director for 20 years, taking on the role in 2000.  Originally the company was based at 1625 North La Brea  in a rehearsal hall once owned by Bob Hope. In 2005 this facility was destroyed to accommodate Hollywood redevelopment and the company moved to 6209 Santa Monica Boulevard - a facility originally operated by the Actors Gang. The Open Fist is notable for its support of both new works and new interpretations of theatre classics in productions typically featuring contemporary production values, ensemble acting, and imaginative direction and design.

It has been the site of numerous premiere productions of then-new plays, including Frank Zappa's rock opera Joe's Garage, The Room by Michael Franco, Love Water by Jacqueline Wright, Neil Labute's The New Testament, and Julie Hébert's St. Joan and the Dancing Sickness.

A yearly summer Director's Festival or First Look Festival also features membership-driven new work. The Open Fist has been nominated and received numerous LA Weekly, Ovation, Garland and other awards.

Production history

1990

True West by Sam Shepard

1991
Car Cemetery by Fernando Arrabal
Child of God by Michael Denney
Cloud Nine by Caryl Churchill
Exit the King by Eugène Ionesco
Professor George by Marsha Sheiness

1992
Baal by Bertolt Brecht
Dusa, Fish, Stas, and Vi by Pam Gems
Goose and Tomtom by David Rabe
Poor Murderer by Pavel Kahout
The Bitter Tears of Petra von Kant by Rainer Werner Fassbinder
Tiny Alice by Edward Albee

1993
Blood Moon by Nicholas Kazan
Cinders by Janusz Glowacki
Ms. Julie by August Strindberg
The Architect and the Emperor of Assyria by Fernando Arrabal
The Last Word by Tony Spiridakis
After the Bomb by Roxy Ventola

1994
The Little Prince by Antoine De Saint-Exupery
The Night Angel by William Piana
Vieux Carre by Tennessee Williams
Hush by April De Angelis

1995
Etta Jenks by Marlene Meyer
The Flight of the Earls by Christopher Humble
Behemoth by Della Vecchia Smith
The Moke Eater by Ken Bernard
Blood and Stumbo; Falling by Beth Burns
Underground by Mark Litton
The Ghost Diaries by Keith Mason

1996
A Warring Absence by Jody Duncan
Time Piece; Guernica by D. O'Brian, Neal Bell
Fear and Misery of the Third Reich by Bertolt Brecht
The God Game by Allison Burnett
Journey of the Fifth Horse by Ronald Ribman
New York 243 by J.D. Zeik

1997
Salam, Shalom by Saleem
The Servant of Two Masters by Carlo Goldoni
Titanic by Christopher Durang
The Vakhos by Euripides
Tabooki (Serial) by Various Authors
After Easter by Anne Devlin
Buddy Jack Adapted by Ron West, Joe Liss

1998
Getting Into My Skin by Saleem
Time Lost by Jack O'Rourke
God’s Country by Steven Dietz
Sex, Death and Other Annoyances by Ron West
The Accompanist by Berberovna/Adapt. Giurgea
Skin by Naomi Iizuka
We Won’t Pay! We Won’t Pay! by Dario Fo
Fall ’98 One-Act Festival by Various Authors
The Notcracker Project (with Circle-X Theatre Company) by Various Authors

1999
Fall Off Night by Allison Gregory
Widows by Ariel Dorfman & Tony Kushner
Slippery People by Charley McQuary
The Life of Galileo by Bertolt Brecht
Escape From Happiness by George F. Walker

2000
The Abdication by Ruth Wolff
Cowboy Mouth; Lobster Man by Sam Shepard, Martin George
How to Explain the History of Communism to Mental Patients by Matei Visniec
Talk Show From Hell by Jean-Noël Fenwick
The King Stag by Carlo Gozzi
2000 Directors Festival by Various Authors
Measure 4 Measure by William Shakespeare
Three Sisters by Anton Chekov
Bay of Smokes by Alena Wilson and Alisa Wilson

2001
The Knacker’s ABC by Boris Vian
The Wooden Breeks by Glen Berger
Casanova by Constance Congdon
2001 Directors Festival by Various Authors
Fen by Caryl Churchill
Sharon and Billy by Alan Bowne
The Freedom Ball by Chelsea Hackett
Exmass by Bradley Rand Smith, Lewis Black & Mark Houghtaling

2002
Perchance To Dream by Jean-Claude Grumberg
Adult Entertainment, Problem Child by George F. Walker
Flight by Mikhail Bulgakov
2002 Directors Festival by Various Authors
The Mound Builders by Lanford Wilson
The Andrea and Hep Show by Andrea Fears, Hep Jamieson and Ron West
I Licked A Slag's Deodorant by Jim Cartwright

2003
Songs of Joy and Destitution by Charles L. Mee Jr.
As I Lay Dying by William Faulkner, adapted by Edward Kemp
Playhouse Creatures by April De Angelis
2003 Directors’ Festival by Various Authors
The Andrea and Hep Show 2: More Faster More Furiouser by Andrea Fears, Hep Jamieson and Ron West
The Cosmonaut’s Last Message to The Woman He Once Loved In The Former Soviet Union  by David Greig

2004
Abingdon Square by Maria Irene Fornes
The Devils by Dostoevsky, adapted by Elizabeth Egloff
Roberto Zucco by Bernard-Marie Koltès
Birdbath by Leonard Melfi
2004 Directors’ Festival by Various Authors
Lydie Breeze by John Guare
The Andrea and Hep Show 3 by Andrea Fears, Hep Jamieson and Ron West

2005
The Chekhov Machine by Matei Visniec
Papa by John DeGroot
General Admissions by Mark Banker
The Threepenny Opera by Bertolt Brecht
Speaking in Tongues by Steven Bovell

2006
Papa (Revival) by John DeGroot
2006 Directors’ Festival by Various Authors
The Time of Your Life by William Saroyan
How to Explain the History of Communism to Mental Patients by Matei Visniec
Autobahn by Neil LaBute
Beautiful City by George Walker

2007
Macbeth by William Shakespeare
Travesties by Tom Stoppard
The Idiot Box by Michael Elyanow
Do Do Love by Laura Richardson
The Room by Michael Franco
Eenie Meanie by Teresa Willis
Seven Santas by Jeff Goode

2008
The Dead by James Joyce
Blue Night in the Heart of the West by James Stock
Comedy of Errors by William Shakespeare
deLEARious by Ron West
Frank Zappa’s Joe's Garage Adaptation by Michael Franco and Pat Towne

2009
Light Up The Sky by Moss Hart
Devil With Boobs by Dario Fo
Love Water by Jacqueline Wright
First Look Festival by Various Authors

Awards and nominations

Current and past affiliated artists
Ziad Hamzeh
Matthew Fox

References

External links
 Official Open Fist Theatre website

Theatre companies in Los Angeles